Cornwall is a historic county and ceremonial county in South West England. It is recognised as one of the Celtic nations, and is the homeland of the Cornish people. Cornwall is bordered to the north and west by the Atlantic Ocean, to the south by the English Channel, and to the east by the county of Devon, with the River Tamar forming the border between them. Cornwall forms the westernmost part of the South West Peninsula of the island of Great Britain. The southwesternmost point is Land's End and the southernmost Lizard Point. The county has been administered since 2009 by the unitary authority, Cornwall Council. The ceremonial county of Cornwall also includes the Isles of Scilly, which are administered separately. The administrative centre of Cornwall is Truro, its only city.

Cornwall was formerly a Brythonic kingdom and subsequently a royal duchy. It is the cultural and ethnic origin of the Cornish diaspora. The Cornish nationalist movement contests the present constitutional status of Cornwall and seeks greater autonomy within the United Kingdom in the form of a devolved legislative Cornish Assembly with powers similar to those in Wales, Scotland and Northern Ireland. In 2014, Cornish people were granted minority status under the European Framework Convention for the Protection of National Minorities, giving them recognition as a distinct ethnic group.

Recent discoveries of Roman remains in Cornwall indicate a greater Roman presence there than once thought. After the collapse of the Roman Empire, Cornwall (along with Devon, parts of Dorset and Somerset, and the Scilly Isles) was a part of the Brittonic kingdom of Dumnonia, ruled by chieftains of the Cornovii who may have included figures regarded as semi-historical or legendary, such as King Mark of Cornwall and King Arthur, evidenced by folklore traditions derived from the Historia Regum Britanniae. The Cornovii division of the Dumnonii tribe were separated from their fellow Brythons of Wales after the Battle of Deorham in AD 577, and often came into conflict with the expanding English kingdom of Wessex. The regions of Dumnonia outside of Cornwall (and Dartmoor) had been annexed by the English by AD 838. King Athelstan in 936 AD set the boundary between the English and Cornish at the high water mark of the eastern bank of the River Tamar. From the Early Middle Ages, language and culture were shared by Brythons trading across both sides of the Channel, resulting in the corresponding high medieval Breton kingdoms of Domnonée and Cornouaille and the Celtic Christianity common to both areas.

Tin mining was important in the Cornish economy from the High Middle Ages, and expanded greatly in the 19th century when rich copper mines were also in production. In the mid-19th century, tin and copper mines entered a period of decline and china clay extraction became more important. Mining had virtually ended by the 1990s. Fishing and agriculture were the other important sectors of the economy, but railways led to a growth of tourism in the 20th century after the decline of the mining and fishing industries. Since the late 2010s there have been hopes of a resurgence of mining in Cornwall after the discovery of 'globally significant' deposits of lithium to help power the electric car revolution.

Cornwall is noted for its geology and coastal scenery. A large part of the Cornubian batholith is within Cornwall. The north coast has many cliffs where exposed geological formations are studied. The area is noted for its wild moorland landscapes, its long and varied coastline, its attractive villages, its many place-names derived from the Cornish language, and its very mild climate. Extensive stretches of Cornwall's coastline, and Bodmin Moor, are protected as an Area of Outstanding Natural Beauty.

Name 

The modern English name Cornwall is a compound of two ancient demonyms coming from two different language groups:
Corn- originates from the Proto-Celtic "*karnos" ("horn" or "headland") is cognate with the English word "horn" (both deriving from the Proto-Indo-European *ker-). An Iron Age tribe that occupied the Cornish peninsula, the Cornovii ("peninsula people") may have also existed.
-wall derives from the Old English exonym "", meaning "foreigner" (i.e. a Welsh person).

In the Cornish language, Cornwall is Kernow which stems from the same Proto-Celtic root.

History

Prehistory, Roman and post-Roman periods

Humans reoccupied Britain after the last Ice Age. The area now known as Cornwall was first inhabited in the Palaeolithic and Mesolithic periods. It continued to be occupied by Neolithic and then by Bronze Age people.

According to John T. Koch and others, Cornwall in the Late Bronze Age formed part of a maritime trading-networked culture which researchers have dubbed the Atlantic Bronze Age and which extended over the areas of present-day Ireland, England, Wales, France, Spain, and Portugal.

During the British Iron Age, Cornwall, like all of Britain (modern England, Scotland, Wales, and the Isle of Man), was inhabited by a Celtic people known as the Britons with distinctive cultural relations to neighbouring Brittany. The Common Brittonic spoken at the time eventually developed into several distinct tongues, including Cornish, Welsh, Breton, Cumbric and Pictish.

The first written account of Cornwall comes from the 1st-century BC Sicilian Greek historian Diodorus Siculus, supposedly quoting or paraphrasing the 4th-century BCE geographer Pytheas, who had sailed to Britain:

The identity of these merchants is unknown. It has been theorised that they were Phoenicians, but there is no evidence for this. Professor Timothy Champion, discussing Diodorus Siculus's comments on the tin trade, states that "Diodorus never actually says that the Phoenicians sailed to Cornwall. In fact, he says quite the opposite: the production of Cornish tin was in the hands of the natives of Cornwall, and its transport to the Mediterranean was organised by local merchants, by sea and then overland through France, passing through areas well outside Phoenician control." Isotopic evidence suggests that tin ingots found off the coast of Haifa, Israel, came from Cornwall. Tin, required for the production of bronze, was a relatively rare and precious commodity in the Bronze Age – hence the interest shown in Devon and Cornwall's tin resources. (For further discussion of tin mining see the section on the economy below.)

In the first four centuries AD, during the time of Roman dominance in Britain, Cornwall was rather remote from the main centres of Romanisation – the nearest being Isca Dumnoniorum, modern-day Exeter. However, the Roman road system extended into Cornwall with four significant Roman sites based on forts: Tregear near Nanstallon was discovered in the early 1970s, two others were found at Restormel Castle, Lostwithiel in 2007, and a third fort near Calstock was also discovered early in 2007. In addition, a Roman-style villa was found at Magor Farm, Illogan in 1935. However, after 410 AD, Cornwall appears to have reverted to rule by Romano-Celtic chieftains of the Cornovii tribe as part of the Brittonic kingdom of Dumnonia (which also included present-day Devonshire and the Scilly Isles), including the territory of one Marcus Cunomorus, with at least one significant power base at Tintagel in the early 6th century.

"King" Mark of Cornwall is a semi-historical figure known from Welsh literature, from the Matter of Britain, and, in particular, from the later Norman-Breton medieval romance of Tristan and Yseult, where he appears as a close relative of King Arthur, himself usually considered to be born of the Cornish people in folklore traditions derived from Geoffrey of Monmouth's 12th-century Historia Regum Britanniae.

Archaeology supports ecclesiastical, literary and legendary evidence for some relative economic stability and close cultural ties between the sub-Roman Westcountry, South Wales, Brittany, the Channel Islands, and Ireland through the fifth and sixth centuries.

Conflict with Wessex
The Battle of Deorham in 577 saw the separation of Dumnonia (and therefore Cornwall) from Wales, following which the Dumnonii often came into conflict with the expanding English kingdom of Wessex. The Annales Cambriae report that in AD 722 the Britons of Cornwall won a battle at "Hehil". It seems likely that the enemy the Cornish fought was a West Saxon force, as evidenced by the naming of King Ine of Wessex and his kinsman Nonna in reference to an earlier Battle of Llongborth in 710.

The Anglo-Saxon Chronicle stated in 815 (adjusted date) "and in this year king Ecgbryht raided in Cornwall from east to west." this has been interpreted to mean a raid from the Tamar to Land's End, and the end of Cornish independence. However, the Anglo-Saxon Chronicle states that in 825 (adjusted date) a battle took place between the Wealas (Cornish) and the Defnas (men of Devon) at Gafulforda. The Cornish giving battle here, and the later battle at Hingston Down, casts doubt on any claims of control Wessex had at this stage.

In 838, the Cornish and their Danish allies were defeated by Egbert in the Battle of Hingston Down at Hengestesdune. In 875, the last recorded king of Cornwall, Dumgarth, is said to have drowned. Around the 880s, Anglo-Saxons from Wessex had established modest land holdings in the north eastern part of Cornwall; notably Alfred the Great who had acquired a few estates. William of Malmesbury, writing around 1120, says that King Athelstan of England (924–939) fixed the boundary between English and Cornish people at the east bank of the River Tamar. While elements of William's story, like the burning of Exeter, have been cast in doubt by recent writers Athelstan did re-establish a separate Cornish Bishop and relations between Wessex and the Cornish elite improved from the time of his rule.

Eventually King Edgar was able to issue charters the width of Cornwall, and frequently sent emissaries or visited personally as seen by his appearances in the Bodmin Manumissions.

Breton–Norman period

One interpretation of the Domesday Book is that by this time the native Cornish landowning class had been almost completely dispossessed and replaced by English landowners, particularly Harold Godwinson himself. However, the Bodmin manumissions show that two leading Cornish figures nominally had Saxon names, but these were both glossed with native Cornish names. In 1068, Brian of Brittany may have been created Earl of Cornwall, and naming evidence cited by medievalist Edith Ditmas suggests that many other post-Conquest landowners in Cornwall were Breton allies of the Normans, the Bretons being descended from Britons who had fled to what is today Brittany during the early years of the Anglo-Saxon conquest. She also proposed this period for the early composition of the Tristan and Iseult cycle by poets such as Béroul from a pre-existing shared Brittonic oral tradition.

Soon after the Norman conquest most of the land was transferred to the new Breton–Norman aristocracy, with the lion's share going to Robert, Count of Mortain, half-brother of King William and the largest landholder in England after the king with his stronghold at Trematon Castle near the mouth of the Tamar.

Later medieval administration and society
Subsequently, however, Norman absentee landlords became replaced by a new Cornish-Norman ruling class including scholars such as Richard Rufus of Cornwall. These families eventually became the new rulers of Cornwall, typically speaking Norman French, Breton-Cornish, Latin, and eventually English, with many becoming involved in the operation of the Stannary Parliament system, the Earldom and eventually the Duchy of Cornwall. The Cornish language continued to be spoken and acquired a number of characteristics establishing its identity as a separate language from Breton.

Stannary parliaments

The stannary parliaments and stannary courts were legislative and legal institutions in Cornwall and in Devon (in the Dartmoor area). The stannary courts administered equity for the region's tin-miners and tin mining interests, and they were also courts of record for the towns dependent on the mines. The separate and powerful government institutions available to the tin miners reflected the enormous importance of the tin industry to the English economy during the Middle Ages. Special laws for tin miners pre-date written legal codes in Britain, and ancient traditions exempted everyone connected with tin mining in Cornwall and Devon from any jurisdiction other than the stannary courts in all but the most exceptional circumstances.

Piracy and smuggling
Cornish piracy was active during the Elizabethan era on the west coast of Britain. Cornwall is well known for its wreckers who preyed on ships passing Cornwall's rocky coastline. During the 17th and 18th centuries Cornwall was a major smuggling area.

Heraldry

In later times, Cornwall was known to the Anglo-Saxons as "West Wales" to distinguish it from "North Wales" (the modern nation of Wales). The name appears in the Anglo-Saxon Chronicle in 891 as On Corn walum. In the Domesday Book it was referred to as Cornualia and in c. 1198 as Cornwal. Other names for the county include a latinisation of the name as Cornubia (first appears in a mid-9th-century deed purporting to be a copy of one dating from c. 705), and as Cornugallia in 1086.

Physical geography

Cornwall forms the tip of the south-west peninsula of the island of Great Britain, and is therefore exposed to the full force of the prevailing winds that blow in from the Atlantic Ocean. The coastline is composed mainly of resistant rocks that give rise in many places to tall cliffs. Cornwall has a border with only one other county, Devon, which is formed almost entirely by the River Tamar, and the remainder (to the north) by the Marsland Valley.

Coastal areas
The north and south coasts have different characteristics. The north coast on the Celtic Sea, part of the Atlantic Ocean, is more exposed and therefore has a wilder nature. However, there are also many extensive stretches of fine golden sand which form the beaches important to the tourist industry, such as those at Bude, Polzeath, Watergate Bay, Perranporth, Porthtowan, Fistral Beach, Newquay, St Agnes, St Ives, and on the south coast Gyllyngvase beach in Falmouth and the large beach at Praa Sands further to the south-west. There are two river estuaries on the north coast: Hayle Estuary and the estuary of the River Camel, which provides Padstow and Rock with a safe harbour. The seaside town of Newlyn is a popular holiday destination, as it is one of the last remaining traditional Cornish fishing ports, with views reaching over Mount's Bay.

The south coast, dubbed the "Cornish Riviera", is more sheltered and there are several broad estuaries offering safe anchorages, such as at Falmouth and Fowey. Beaches on the south coast usually consist of coarser sand and shingle, interspersed with rocky sections of wave-cut platform. Also on the south coast, the picturesque fishing village of Polperro, at the mouth of the Pol River, and the fishing port of Looe on the River Looe are both popular with tourists.

Inland areas
The interior of the county consists of a roughly east–west spine of infertile and exposed upland, with a series of granite intrusions, such as Bodmin Moor, which contains the highest land within Cornwall. From east to west, and with approximately descending altitude, these are Bodmin Moor, Hensbarrow north of St Austell, Carnmenellis to the south of Camborne, and the Penwith or Land's End peninsula. These intrusions are the central part of the granite outcrops that form the exposed parts of the Cornubian batholith of south-west Britain, which also includes Dartmoor to the east in Devon and the Isles of Scilly to the west, the latter now being partially submerged.

The intrusion of the granite into the surrounding sedimentary rocks gave rise to extensive metamorphism and mineralisation, and this led to Cornwall being one of the most important mining areas in Europe until the early 20th century. It is thought tin was mined here as early as the Bronze Age, and copper, lead, zinc and silver have all been mined in Cornwall. Alteration of the granite also gave rise to extensive deposits of China Clay, especially in the area to the north of St Austell, and the extraction of this remains an important industry.

The uplands are surrounded by more fertile, mainly pastoral farmland. Near the south coast, deep wooded valleys provide sheltered conditions for flora that like shade and a moist, mild climate. These areas lie mainly on Devonian sandstone and slate. The north east of Cornwall lies on Carboniferous rocks known as the Culm Measures. In places these have been subjected to severe folding, as can be seen on the north coast near Crackington Haven and in several other locations.

Lizard Peninsula

The geology of the Lizard peninsula is unusual, in that it is mainland Britain's only example of an ophiolite, a section of oceanic crust now found on land. Much of the peninsula consists of the dark green and red Precambrian serpentinite, which forms spectacular cliffs, notably at Kynance Cove, and carved and polished serpentine ornaments are sold in local gift shops. This ultramafic rock also forms a very infertile soil which covers the flat and marshy heaths of the interior of the peninsula. This is home to rare plants, such as the Cornish Heath, which has been adopted as the county flower.

Hills and high points

Settlements and transport

Cornwall's only city, and the home of the council headquarters, is Truro. Nearby Falmouth is notable as a port. St Just in Penwith is the westernmost town in England, though the same claim has been made for Penzance, which is larger. St Ives and Padstow are today small vessel ports with a major tourism and leisure sector in their economies. Newquay on the north coast is another major urban settlement which is known for its beaches and is a popular surfing destination, as is Bude further north, but Newquay is now also becoming important for its aviation-related industries. Camborne is the county's largest town and more populous than the capital Truro. Together with the neighbouring town of Redruth, it forms the largest urban area in Cornwall, and both towns were significant as centres of the global tin mining industry in the 19th century; nearby copper mines were also very productive during that period. St Austell is also larger than Truro and was the centre of the china clay industry in Cornwall. Until four new parishes were created for the St Austell area on 1 April 2009 St Austell was the largest settlement in Cornwall.

Cornwall borders the county of Devon at the River Tamar. Major roads between Cornwall and the rest of Great Britain are the A38 which crosses the Tamar at Plymouth via the Tamar Bridge and the town of Saltash, the A39 road (Atlantic Highway) from Barnstaple, passing through North Cornwall to end in Falmouth, and the A30 which connects Cornwall to the M5 motorway at Exeter, crosses the border south of Launceston, crosses Bodmin Moor and connects Bodmin, Truro, Redruth, Camborne, Hayle and Penzance. Torpoint Ferry links Plymouth with Torpoint on the opposite side of the Hamoaze. A rail bridge, the Royal Albert Bridge built by Isambard Kingdom Brunel (1859), provides the other main land transport link. The city of Plymouth, a large urban centre in south west Devon, is an important location for services such as hospitals, department stores, road and rail transport, and cultural venues, particularly for people living in east Cornwall.

Cardiff and Swansea, across the Bristol Channel, have at some times in the past been connected to Cornwall by ferry, but these do not operate now.

The Isles of Scilly are served by ferry (from Penzance) and by aeroplane, having its own airport: St Mary's Airport. There are regular flights between St Mary's and Land's End Airport, near St Just, and Newquay Airport; during the summer season, a service is also provided between St Mary's and Exeter Airport, in Devon.

Ecology

Flora and fauna

Cornwall has varied habitats including terrestrial and marine ecosystems. One noted species in decline locally is the Reindeer lichen, which species has been made a priority for protection under the national UK Biodiversity Action Plan.

Botanists divide Cornwall and Scilly into two vice-counties: West (1) and East (2). The standard flora is by F. H. Davey Flora of Cornwall (1909). Davey was assisted by A. O. Hume and he thanks Hume, his companion on excursions in Cornwall and Devon, and for help in the compilation of that Flora, publication of which was financed by him.

Climate

Cornwall has a temperate Oceanic climate (Köppen climate classification: Cfb), with mild winters and cool summers. Cornwall has the mildest and one of the sunniest climates of the United Kingdom, as a result of its oceanic setting and the influence of the Gulf Stream. Winters are among the warmest in the country due to the moderating effects of the warm ocean currents, and frost and snow are very rare at the coast and are also rare in the central upland areas. Summers are, however, not as warm as in other parts of southern England. The surrounding sea and its southwesterly position mean that Cornwall's weather can be relatively changeable.

Cornwall is one of the sunniest areas in the UK. It has more than 1,541 hours of sunshine per year, with the highest average of 7.6 hours of sunshine per day in July. However, this is not as much as in more northern areas of the west coast. The Isles of Scilly, for example, where there are on average fewer than two days of air frost per year, is the only area in the UK to be in the Hardiness zone 10. The islands have, on average, less than one day of air temperature exceeding 30 °C per year and are in the AHS Heat Zone 1. Extreme temperatures in Cornwall are particularly rare; however, extreme weather in the form of storms and floods is common.

Culture

Language

Cornish language

 
Cornish, a member of the Brythonic branch of the Celtic language family, is a revived language that died out as a first language in the late 18th century. It is closely related to the other Brythonic languages, Breton and Welsh, and less so to the Goidelic languages. Cornish has no legal status in the UK.

There has been a revival of the language by academics and optimistic enthusiasts since the mid-19th century that gained momentum from the publication in 1904 of Henry Jenner's Handbook of the Cornish Language. It is a social networking community language rather than a social community group language. Cornwall Council encourages and facilitates language classes within the county, in schools and within the wider community.

In 2002, Cornish was named as a UK regional language in the European Charter for Regional or Minority Languages. As a result, in 2005 its promoters received limited government funding. Several words originating in Cornish are used in the mining terminology of English, such as costean, gossan, gunnies, kibbal, kieve and vug.

English dialect

The Cornish language and culture influenced the emergence of particular pronunciations and grammar not used elsewhere in England. The Cornish dialect is spoken to varying degrees; however, someone speaking in broad Cornish may be practically unintelligible to one not accustomed to it. Cornish dialect has generally declined, as in most places it is now little more than a regional accent and grammatical differences have been eroded over time. Marked differences in vocabulary and usage still exist between the eastern and western parts of Cornwall.

Flag

Saint Piran's Flag is the national flag and ancient banner of Cornwall, and an emblem of the Cornish people. It is regarded as the county flag by Cornwall Council. The banner of Saint Piran is a white cross on a black background (in terms of heraldry 'sable, a cross argent'). According to legend Saint Piran adopted these colours from seeing the white tin in the black coals and ashes during his discovery of tin. The Cornish flag is an exact reverse of the former Breton black cross national flag and is known by the same name "Kroaz Du".

Arts and media

Since the 19th century, Cornwall, with its unspoilt maritime scenery and strong light, has sustained a vibrant visual art scene of international renown. Artistic activity within Cornwall was initially centred on the art-colony of Newlyn, most active at the turn of the 20th century. This Newlyn School is associated with the names of Stanhope Forbes, Elizabeth Forbes, Norman Garstin and Lamorna Birch. Modernist writers such as D. H. Lawrence and Virginia Woolf lived in Cornwall between the wars, and Ben Nicholson, the painter, having visited in the 1920s came to live in St Ives with his then wife, the sculptor Barbara Hepworth, at the outbreak of the Second World War. They were later joined by the Russian emigrant Naum Gabo, and other artists. These included Peter Lanyon, Terry Frost, Patrick Heron, Bryan Wynter and Roger Hilton. St Ives also houses the Leach Pottery, where Bernard Leach, and his followers championed Japanese inspired studio pottery. Much of this modernist work can be seen in Tate St Ives. The Newlyn Society and Penwith Society of Arts continue to be active, and contemporary visual art is documented in a dedicated online journal.

Local television programmes are provided by BBC South West & ITV West Country. Radio programmes are produced by BBC Radio Cornwall in Truro for the entire county, Heart West, Source FM for the Falmouth and Penryn areas, Coast FM for west Cornwall, Radio St Austell Bay for the St Austell area, NCB Radio for north Cornwall & Pirate FM.

Music

Cornwall has a folk music tradition that has survived into the present and is well known for its unusual folk survivals such as Mummers Plays, the Furry Dance in Helston played by the famous Helston Town Band, and Obby Oss in Padstow.

Newlyn is home to a food and music festival that hosts live music, cooking demonstrations, and displays of locally caught fish.

As in other former mining districts of Britain, male voice choirs and brass bands, such as Brass on the Grass concerts during the summer at Constantine, are still very popular in Cornwall. Cornwall also has around 40 brass bands, including the six-times National Champions of Great Britain, Camborne Youth Band, and the bands of Lanner and St Dennis.

Cornish players are regular participants in inter-Celtic festivals, and Cornwall itself has several inter-Celtic festivals such as Perranporth's Lowender Peran folk festival.

Contemporary musician Richard D. James (also known as Aphex Twin) grew up in Cornwall, as did Luke Vibert and Alex Parks, winner of Fame Academy 2003. Roger Taylor, the drummer from the band Queen was also raised in the county, and currently lives not far from Falmouth. The American singer-songwriter Tori Amos now resides predominantly in North Cornwall not far from Bude with her family. The lutenist, composer and festival director Ben Salfield lives in Truro. Mick Fleetwood of Fleetwood Mac was born in Redruth.

Literature
Cornwall's rich heritage and dramatic landscape have inspired numerous writers.

Fiction

Sir Arthur Quiller-Couch, author of many novels and works of literary criticism, lived in Fowey: his novels are mainly set in Cornwall. Daphne du Maurier lived at Menabilly near Fowey and many of her novels had Cornish settings: The Loving Spirit, Jamaica Inn, Rebecca, Frenchman's Creek, The King's General (partially), My Cousin Rachel, The House on the Strand and Rule Britannia. She is also noted for writing Vanishing Cornwall. Cornwall provided the inspiration for The Birds, one of her terrifying series of short stories, made famous as a film by Alfred Hitchcock. 

Conan Doyle's The Adventure of the Devil's Foot featuring Sherlock Holmes is set in Cornwall. Winston Graham's series Poldark, Kate Tremayne's Adam Loveday series, Susan Cooper's novels Over Sea, Under Stone and Greenwitch, and Mary Wesley's The Camomile Lawn are all set in Cornwall. Writing under the pseudonym of Alexander Kent, Douglas Reeman sets parts of his Richard Bolitho and Adam Bolitho series in the Cornwall of the late 18th and the early 19th centuries, particularly in Falmouth. Gilbert K. Chesterton placed the action of many of his stories there.

Medieval Cornwall is the setting of the trilogy by Monica Furlong, Wise Child, Juniper and Colman, as well as part of Charles Kingsley's Hereward the Wake.

Hammond Innes's novel, The Killer Mine; Charles de Lint's novel The Little Country; and Chapters 24–25 of J. K. Rowling's Harry Potter and the Deathly Hallows take place in Cornwall (Shell Cottage, on the beach outside the fictional village of Tinworth).

David Cornwell, who wrote espionage novels under the name John le Carré, lived and worked in Cornwall. Nobel Prize-winning novelist William Golding was born in St Columb Minor in 1911, and returned to live near Truro from 1985 until his death in 1993. D. H. Lawrence spent a short time living in Cornwall. Rosamunde Pilcher grew up in Cornwall, and several of her books take place there.

St. Michael's Mount in Cornwall (under the fictional name of Mount Polbearne) is the setting of the Little Beach Street Bakery series by Jenny Colgan, who spent holidays in Cornwall as a child. The book series includes Little Beach Street Bakery (2014), Summer at Little Beach Street Bakery (2015), Christmas at Little Beach Street Bakery (2016), and Sunrise by the Sea (2021).

In the Paddington Bear novels by Michael Bond the title character is said to have landed at an unspecified port in Cornwall having travelled in a lifeboat aboard a cargo ship from darkest Peru. From here he travels to London on a train and eventually arrives at Paddington Station.

Poetry

The late Poet Laureate Sir John Betjeman was famously fond of Cornwall and it featured prominently in his poetry. He is buried in the churchyard at St Enodoc's Church, Trebetherick.
Charles Causley, the poet, was born in Launceston and is perhaps the best known of Cornish poets. Jack Clemo and the scholar A. L. Rowse were also notable Cornishmen known for their poetry; The Rev. R. S. Hawker of Morwenstow wrote some poetry which was very popular in the Victorian period. The Scottish poet W. S. Graham lived in West Cornwall from 1944 until his death in 1986.

The poet Laurence Binyon wrote "For the Fallen" (first published in 1914) while sitting on the cliffs between Pentire Point and The Rumps and a stone plaque was erected in 2001 to commemorate the fact. The plaque bears the inscription "FOR THE FALLEN / Composed on these cliffs, 1914". The plaque also bears below this the fourth stanza (sometimes referred to as "The Ode") of the poem:
They shall grow not old, as we that are left grow old
Age shall not weary them, nor the years condemn
At the going down of the sun and in the morning
We will remember them

Other literary works
Cornwall produced a substantial number of passion plays such as the Ordinalia during the Middle Ages. Many are still extant, and provide valuable information about the Cornish language. See also Cornish literature

Colin Wilson, a prolific writer who is best known for his debut work The Outsider (1956) and for The Mind Parasites (1967), lived in Gorran Haven, a small village on the southern Cornish coast. The writer D. M. Thomas was born in Redruth but lived and worked in Australia and the United States before returning to his native Cornwall. He has written novels, poetry, and other works, including translations from Russian.

Thomas Hardy's drama The Queen of Cornwall (1923) is a version of the Tristan story; the second act of Richard Wagner's opera Tristan und Isolde takes place in Cornwall, as do Gilbert and Sullivan's operettas The Pirates of Penzance and Ruddigore.

Clara Vyvyan was the author of various books about many aspects of Cornish life such as Our Cornwall. She once wrote: "The Loneliness of Cornwall is a loneliness unchanged by the presence of men, its freedoms a freedom inexpressible by description or epitaph. Your cannot say Cornwall is this or that. Your cannot describe it in a word or visualise it in a second. You may know the country from east to west and sea to sea, but if you close your eyes and think about it no clear-cut image rises before you. In this quality of changefulness have we possibly surprised the secret of Cornwall's wild spirit—in this intimacy the essence of its charm? Cornwall!".
A level of Tomb Raider: Legend, a game dealing with Arthurian Legend, takes place in Cornwall at a museum above King Arthur's tomb. The adventure game The Lost Crown is set in the fictional town of Saxton, which uses the Cornish settlements of Polperro, Talland and Looe as its model.

The fairy tale Jack the Giant Killer takes place in Cornwall.

The Mousehole Cat, a children's book written by Antonia Barber and illustrated by Nicola Bayley, is set in the Cornish village Mousehole and based on the legend of Tom Bawcock and the continuing tradition of Tom Bawcock's Eve.

Sports

The main sports played in Cornwall are rugby, football and cricket. Athletes from Truro have done well in Olympic and Commonwealth Games fencing, winning several medals. Surfing is popular, particularly with tourists, thousands of which take to the water throughout the summer months. Some towns and villages have bowling clubs, and a wide variety of British sports are played throughout Cornwall. Cornwall is also one of the few places in England where shinty is played; the English Shinty Association is based in Penryn.

The Cornwall County Cricket Club plays as one of the minor counties of English cricket. Truro, and all of the towns and some villages have football clubs belonging to the Cornwall County Football Association.

Rugby football

Viewed as an "important identifier of ethnic affiliation", rugby union has become a sport strongly tied to notions of Cornishness. and since the 20th century, rugby union has emerged as one of the most popular spectator and team sports in Cornwall (perhaps the most popular), with professional Cornish rugby footballers being described as a "formidable force", "naturally independent, both in thought and deed, yet paradoxically staunch English patriots whose top players have represented England with pride and passion".

In 1985, sports journalist Alan Gibson made a direct connection between love of rugby in Cornwall and the ancient parish games of hurling and wrestling that existed for centuries before rugby officially began. Among Cornwall's native sports are a distinctive form of Celtic wrestling related to Breton wrestling, and Cornish hurling, a kind of mediaeval football played with a silver ball (distinct from Irish Hurling). Cornish Wrestling is Cornwall's oldest sport and as Cornwall's native tradition it has travelled the world to places like Victoria, Australia and Grass Valley, California following the miners and gold rushes. Cornish hurling now takes place at St. Columb Major, St Ives, and less frequently at Bodmin.

In rugby league, Cornwall R.L.F.C., founded in 2021, will represent the county in the professional league system. The semi-pro club will start in the third tier RFL League 1. At amateur level, the county is represented by Cornish Rebels.

Surfing and watersports

Due to its long coastline, various maritime sports are popular in Cornwall, notably sailing and surfing. International events in both are held in Cornwall. Cornwall hosted the Inter-Celtic Watersports Festival in 2006. Surfing in particular is very popular, as locations such as Bude and Newquay offer some of the best surf in the UK. Pilot gig rowing has been popular for many years and the World championships takes place annually on the Isles of Scilly. On 2 September 2007, 300 surfers at Polzeath beach set a new world record for the highest number of surfers riding the same wave as part of the Global Surf Challenge and part of a project called Earthwave to raise awareness about global warming.

Fencing
As its population is comparatively small, and largely rural, Cornwall's contribution to British national sport in the United Kingdom has been limited; the county's greatest successes have come in fencing. In 2014, half of the men's GB team fenced for Truro Fencing Club, and 3 Truro fencers appeared at the 2012 Olympics.

Cuisine

Cornwall has a strong culinary heritage. Surrounded on three sides by the sea amid fertile fishing grounds, Cornwall naturally has fresh seafood readily available; Newlyn is the largest fishing port in the UK by value of fish landed, and is known for its wide range of restaurants. Television chef Rick Stein has long operated a fish restaurant in Padstow for this reason, and Jamie Oliver chose to open his second restaurant, Fifteen, in Watergate Bay near Newquay. MasterChef host and founder of Smiths of Smithfield, John Torode, in 2007 purchased Seiners in Perranporth. One famous local fish dish is Stargazy pie, a fish-based pie in which the heads of the fish stick through the piecrust, as though "star-gazing". The pie is cooked as part of traditional celebrations for Tom Bawcock's Eve, but is not generally eaten at any other time.

Cornwall is perhaps best known though for its pasties, a savoury dish made with pastry. Today's pasties usually contain a filling of beef steak, onion, potato and swede with salt and white pepper, but historically pasties had a variety of different fillings. "Turmut, 'tates and mate" (i.e. "Turnip, potatoes and meat", turnip being the Cornish and Scottish term for swede, itself an abbreviation of 'Swedish Turnip', the British term for rutabaga) describes a filling once very common. For instance, the licky pasty contained mostly leeks, and the herb pasty contained watercress, parsley, and shallots. Pasties are often locally referred to as oggies. Historically, pasties were also often made with sweet fillings such as jam, apple and blackberry, plums or cherries.
The wet climate and relatively poor soil of Cornwall make it unsuitable for growing many arable crops. However, it is ideal for growing the rich grass required for dairying, leading to the production of Cornwall's other famous export, clotted cream. This forms the basis for many local specialities including Cornish fudge and Cornish ice cream. Cornish clotted cream has Protected Geographical Status under EU law, and cannot be made anywhere else. Its principal manufacturer is A. E. Rodda & Son of Scorrier.

Local cakes and desserts include Saffron cake, Cornish heavy (hevva) cake, Cornish fairings biscuits, figgy 'obbin, Cream tea and whortleberry pie.

There are also many types of beers brewed in Cornwall—those produced by Sharp's Brewery, Skinner's Brewery, Keltek Brewery and St Austell Brewery are the best known—including stouts, ales and other beer types. There is some small scale production of wine, mead and cider.

Politics and administration

Cornish national identity

 Cornwall is recognised by Cornish and Celtic political groups as one of six Celtic nations, alongside Brittany, Ireland, the Isle of Man, Scotland and Wales. (The Isle of Man Government and the Welsh Government also recognise Asturias and Galicia.) Cornwall is represented, as one of the Celtic nations, at the Festival Interceltique de Lorient, an annual celebration of Celtic culture held in Brittany.

Cornwall Council consider Cornwall's unique cultural heritage and distinctiveness to be one of the area's major assets. They see Cornwall's language, landscape, Celtic identity, political history, patterns of settlement, maritime tradition, industrial heritage, and non-conformist tradition, to be among the features making up its "distinctive" culture. However, it is uncertain exactly how many of the people living in Cornwall consider themselves to be Cornish; results from different surveys (including the national census) have varied. In the 2001 census, 7 per cent of people in Cornwall identified themselves as Cornish, rather than British or English. However, activists have argued that this underestimated the true number as there was no explicit "Cornish" option included in the official census form. Subsequent surveys have suggested that as many as 44 per cent identify as Cornish. Many people in Cornwall say that this issue would be resolved if a Cornish option became available on the census. The question and content recommendations for the 2011 census provided an explanation of the process of selecting an ethnic identity which is relevant to the understanding of the often quoted figure of 37,000 who claimed Cornish identity. The 2021 census found that 17% of people in Cornwall identified as being Cornish (89,000), with 14% of people in Cornwall identifying as Cornish-only (80,000). Again there was no tick-box provided, and "Cornish" had to be written-in as "Other".

On 24 April 2014 it was announced that Cornish people have been granted minority status under the European Framework Convention for the Protection of National Minorities.

Local politics

With the exception of the Isles of Scilly, Cornwall is governed by a unitary authority, Cornwall Council, based in Truro. The Crown Court is based at the Courts of Justice in Truro. Magistrates' Courts are found in Truro (but at a different location to the Crown Court) and at Bodmin.

The Isles of Scilly form part of the ceremonial county of Cornwall, and have, at times, been served by the same county administration. Since 1890 they have been administered by their own unitary authority, the Council of the Isles of Scilly. They are grouped with Cornwall for other administrative purposes, such as the National Health Service and Devon and Cornwall Police.

Before reorganisation on 1 April 2009, council functions throughout the rest of Cornwall were organised in two tiers, with Cornwall County Council and district councils for its six districts, Caradon, Carrick, Kerrier, North Cornwall, Penwith, and Restormel. While projected to streamline services, cut red tape and save around £17 million a year, the reorganisation was met with wide opposition, with a poll in 2008 showing 89% disapproval from Cornish residents.

The first elections for the unitary authority were held on 4 June 2009. The council has 123 seats; the largest party (in 2017) is the Conservatives, with 46 seats. The Liberal Democrats are the second-largest party, with 37 seats, with the Independents the third-largest grouping with 30.

Before the creation of the unitary council, the former county council had 82 seats, the majority of which were held by the Liberal Democrats, elected at the 2005 county council elections. The six former districts had a total of 249 council seats, and the groups with greatest numbers of councillors were Liberal Democrats, Conservatives and Independents.

Parliament and national politics
Following a review by the Boundary Commission for England taking effect at the 2010 general election, Cornwall is divided into six county constituencies to elect MPs to the House of Commons of the United Kingdom.

Before the 2010 boundary changes Cornwall had five constituencies, all of which were won by Liberal Democrats at the 2005 general election. In the 2010 general election Liberal Democrat candidates won three constituencies and Conservative candidates won three other constituencies. At the 2015 general election all six Cornish seats were won by Conservative candidates; all these Conservative MPs retained their seats at the 2017 general election, and the Conservatives won all six constituencies again at the 2019 general election.

Until 1832, Cornwall had 44 MPs—more than any other county—reflecting the importance of tin to the Crown. Most of the increase in numbers of MPs came between 1529 and 1584 after which there was no change until 1832.

Devolution movement

Cornish nationalists have organised into two political parties: Mebyon Kernow, formed in 1951, and the Cornish Nationalist Party. In addition to the political parties, there are various interest groups such as the Revived Cornish Stannary Parliament and the Celtic League. The Cornish Constitutional Convention was formed in 2000 as a cross-party organisation including representatives from the private, public and voluntary sectors to campaign for the creation of a Cornish Assembly, along the lines of the National Assembly for Wales, Northern Ireland Assembly and the Scottish Parliament. Between 5 March 2000 and December 2001, the campaign collected the signatures of 41,650 Cornish residents endorsing the call for a devolved assembly, along with 8,896 signatories from outside Cornwall. The resulting petition was presented to the Prime Minister, Tony Blair.

Emergency services
Devon and Cornwall Police
Cornwall Fire and Rescue Service
South Western Ambulance Service
Cornwall Air Ambulance
HM Coastguard
Cornwall Search & Rescue Team
British Transport Police

Economy

Cornwall is one of the poorest parts of the United Kingdom in terms of per capita GDP and average household incomes. At the same time, parts of the county, especially on the coast, have high house prices, driven up by demand from relatively wealthy retired people and second-home owners. The GVA per head was 65% of the UK average for 2004. The GDP per head for Cornwall and the Isles of Scilly was 79.2% of the EU-27 average for 2004, the UK per head average was 123.0%. In 2011, the latest available figures, Cornwall's (including the Isles of Scilly) measure of wealth was 64% of the European average per capita.

Historically mining of tin (and later also of copper) was important in the Cornish economy. The first reference to this appears to be by Pytheas: see above. Julius Caesar was the last classical writer to mention the tin trade, which appears to have declined during the Roman occupation. The tin trade revived in the Middle Ages and its importance to the Kings of England resulted in certain privileges being granted to the tinners; the Cornish rebellion of 1497 is attributed to grievances of the tin miners. In the mid-19th century, however, the tin trade again fell into decline. Other primary sector industries that have declined since the 1960s include china clay production, fishing and farming.

Today, the Cornish economy depends heavily on its tourist industry, which makes up around a quarter of the economy. The official measures of deprivation and poverty at district and 'sub-ward' level show that there is great variation in poverty and prosperity in Cornwall with some areas among the poorest in England and others among the top half in prosperity. For example, the ranking of 32,482 sub-wards in England in the index of multiple deprivation (2006) ranged from 819th (part of Penzance East) to 30,899th (part of Saltash Burraton in Caradon), where the lower number represents the greater deprivation.

Cornwall is one of two UK areas designated as 'less developed regions' which qualify for Cohesion Policy grants from the European Union. It was granted Objective 1 status by the European Commission for 2000 to 2006, followed by further rounds of funding known as 'Convergence Funding' from 2007 to 2013 and 'Growth Programme' for 2014 to 2020.

Tourism

Cornwall has a tourism-based seasonal economy which is estimated to contribute up to 24% of Cornwall's gross domestic product. In 2011 tourism brought £1.85 billion into the Cornish economy. Cornwall's unique culture, spectacular landscape and mild climate make it a popular tourist destination, despite being somewhat distant from the United Kingdom's main centres of population. Surrounded on three sides by the English Channel and Celtic Sea, Cornwall has many miles of beaches and cliffs; the South West Coast Path follows a complete circuit of both coasts. Other tourist attractions include moorland, country gardens, museums, historic and prehistoric sites, and wooded valleys. Five million tourists visit Cornwall each year, mostly drawn from within the UK. Visitors to Cornwall are served by the airport at Newquay, whilst private jets, charters and helicopters are also served by Perranporth airfield; nightsleeper and daily rail services run between Cornwall, London and other regions of the UK.

Newquay and Porthtowan are popular destinations for surfers. In recent years, the Eden Project near St Austell has been a major financial success, drawing one in eight of Cornwall's visitors in 2004.

In the summer of 2018, due to the recognition of its beaches and weather through social media and the marketing of travel companies, Cornwall received about 20 per cent more visitors than the usual 4.5 million figure. The sudden rise and demand of tourism in Cornwall caused multiple traffic and safety issues in coastal areas.

In October 2021, Cornwall was longlisted for the UK City of Culture 2025, but failed to make the March 2022 shortlist.

Fishing

Other industries include fishing, although this has been significantly re-structured by EU fishing policies ( the Southwest Handline Fishermen's Association has started to revive the fishing industry).

Agriculture
Agriculture, once an important part of the Cornish economy, has declined significantly relative to other industries. However, there is still a strong dairy industry, with products such as Cornish clotted cream.

Mining

Mining of tin and copper was also an industry, but today the derelict mine workings survive only as a World Heritage Site. However, the Camborne School of Mines, which was relocated to Penryn in 2004, is still a world centre of excellence in the field of mining and applied geology and the grant of World Heritage status has attracted funding for conservation and heritage tourism. China clay extraction has also been an important industry in the St Austell area, but this sector has been in decline, and this, coupled with increased mechanisation, has led to a decrease in employment in this sector, although the industry still employs around 2,133 people in Cornwall, and generates over £80 million to the local economy.

In March 2016, a Canadian company, Strongbow Exploration, had acquired, from administration, a 100% interest in the South Crofty tin mine and the associated mineral rights in Cornwall with the aim of reopening the mine and bringing it back to full production. Work is currently ongoing to build a water filtration plant in order to dewater the mine.

Internet
Cornwall is the landing point for twenty-two of the world's fastest high-speed undersea and transatlantic fibre optic cables, making Cornwall an important hub within Europe's Internet infrastructure. The Superfast Cornwall project completed in 2015, and saw 95% of Cornish houses and businesses connected to a fibre-based broadband network, with over 90% of properties able to connect with speeds above 24 Mbit/s.

Aerospace
The county's newest industry is aviation: Newquay Airport is the home of a growing business park with Enterprise Zone status, known as Aerohub. Also a space launch facility, Spaceport Cornwall, has been established at Newquay, in partnership with Goonhilly satellite tracking station near Helston in south Cornwall.

Demographics

Cornwall's population was 537,400 in the 2011 census, with a population density of 144 people per square kilometre, ranking it 40th and 41st, respectively, among the 47 counties of England. Cornwall's population was 95.7% White British and has a relatively high rate of population growth. At 11.2% in the 1980s and 5.3% in the 1990s, it had the fifth-highest population growth rate of the counties of England. The natural change has been a small population decline, and the population increase is due to inward migration into Cornwall. According to the 1991 census, the population was 469,800.

Cornwall has a relatively high retired population, with 22.9% of pensionable age, compared with 20.3% for the United Kingdom as a whole. This may be due partly to Cornwall's rural and coastal geography increasing its popularity as a retirement location, and partly to outward migration of younger residents to more economically diverse areas.

Education

Over 10,000 students attend Cornwall's two universities, Falmouth University and the University of Exeter (including Camborne School of Mines). Falmouth University is a specialist public university for the creative industries and arts, while the University Of Exeter has two campuses in Cornwall, Truro and Penryn, the latter shared with Falmouth. Penryn campus is home to educational departments such as the rapidly growing Centre for Ecology and Conservation (CEC), the Environment and Sustainability Institute (ESI), and the Institute of Cornish Studies.

Cornwall has a comprehensive education system, with 31 state and eight independent secondary schools. There are three further education colleges: Truro and Penwith College, Cornwall College and Callywith College which opened in September 2017. The Isles of Scilly only has one school, while the former Restormel district has the highest school population, and school year sizes are around 200, with none above 270. Before the introduction of comprehensive schools there were a number of grammar schools and secondary modern schools, e.g. the schools that later became Sir James Smith's School and Wadebridge School. There are also primary schools in many villages and towns: e.g. St Mabyn Church of England Primary School.

See also

Christianity in Cornwall
 Index of Cornwall-related articles
 Outline of Cornwall – overview of the wide range of topics covered by this subject
 Tamar Valley AONB
Duchy of Cornwall

Notes

References

Sources 

 
  A second edition was published in 2001 by the House of Stratus, Thirsk: the original text new illustrations and an afterword by Halliday's son

Further reading
 
 
  (illustrated edition Published by Victor Gollancz, London, 1981, photographs by Christian Browning)
  (Available online on Google Books).
  (Available online on Digital Book Index)
  (Available online on Google Books).
 
 
 
 
 
  (eleven chapters by various hands, including three previously published essays)

External links

Cornwall Council
 
 The History of Parliament: the House of Commons – Cornwall, County, 1386 to 1831

 Images of daily life in late 19th century Cornwall
 Images of Cornwall at the English Heritage Archive

 
Celtic nations
English unitary authorities created in 2009
Local government districts of South West England
NUTS 2 statistical regions of the United Kingdom
Peninsulas of England
Unitary authority districts of England
Counties in South West England
Counties of England established in antiquity
Former kingdoms